Portrait from Life (also known as Lost Daughter, and in the U.S. as The Girl in the Painting) is a 1948 British drama film directed by Terence Fisher and starring Mai Zetterling, Robert Beatty and Guy Rolfe.

Plot
A British Army officer, Major Lawrence (Guy Rolfe), is on leave from being stationed in occupied Germany just after WW2 when he sees a painting of a beautiful young girl called Hildegard in a London art gallery. While viewing the painting he is approached by an old man, Professor Franz Menzel (Arnold Marlé), who escaped from Nazi Germany in the 1930s leaving his family behind and claims to be the young girl's father. Major Lawrence agrees to search for the young girl when he returns to Germany. On returning to Germany and after a long search Major Lawrence eventually tracks down the young girl but she is suffering from amnesia and living with a German couple who claim to be her parents. As Lawrence investigates, the circumstances of the young girl's past become more complicated.

Partial cast
 Mai Zetterling as Hildegard / Lidia
 Robert Beatty as Campbell Reid
 Guy Rolfe as Major Lawrence
 Herbert Lom as Fritz Kottler Hendlemann
 Patrick Holt as Ferguson
 Arnold Marlé as Professor Franz Menzel
 Sybille Binder as Eitel Hendlemann
 Thora Hird as Mrs. Skinner 
 Gerard Heinz as Heine  
 Yvonne Owen as Helen
 Philo Hauser as Hans Ackermann
 Pete Murray as Lt. Keith
 Gordon Bell as Captain Roberts
 Nelly Arno as Anna Skutetsky
 Cyril Chamberlain as Supervisor 
 Betty Lynne as Interpreter
 Anthony Steel as Bridegroom
 John Blythe as Club Manager

Production
Anthony Steel has one of his earliest film appearances.

Critical reception
The New York Times wrote, "the new picture at the Little Carnegie stems from an intriguing idea, and there are several very effective sequences in the drama, plus a fine performance by the Swedish actress, Mai Zetterling. Indeed, if the whole of The Girl in the Painting were as good as its parts, the posting of this notice would be a much more pleasant task. Too much, rather than too little, story and plodding direction are the principal faults"; while Allmovie described it as "an over-orchestrated "guilty pleasure" from the glory days of British romance pictures."

Box office
The film made a profit of £4,100.

References

External links

1948 films
Films directed by Terence Fisher
British drama films
1948 drama films
Films with screenplays by Muriel Box
Films with screenplays by Sydney Box
Films set in Germany
Films set in London
Films set in 1946
Films about amnesia
Films scored by Benjamin Frankel
British black-and-white films
1940s British films